Alfred Pribram (11 May 1841 – 14 April 1912) was a Bohemian internist born in Prague. He was a brother of chemist Richard Pribram (1847–1928). His son was the internist Hugo Pribram (1881–1943).

Biography 
He studied medicine at the University of Prague, earning his doctorate as a general practitioner in 1861 and as a surgeon during the following year. From 1867 to 1871 he worked as an assistant to Anton von Jaksch (1810–1887) at the second medical clinic in Prague. In 1871 he received his habilitation, and in 1887 was appointed full professor of special pathology and therapy at the University of Prague.  Among his better known students was physician Eduard Bloch (1872–1945).

Pribram is remembered for his extensive research of arthritis, typhoid and typhinia (relapsing fever).

Selected publications 
 Studien über Febris Recurrens, (Studies on relapsing fever); with Josef Robitschek, 1868
 Studien über Cholera (Studies on cholera), 1869
 Studien über die Zuckerlose Harnruhr (Studies on diabetes insipidus), 1870
 Ueber die Sterblichkeit in Prag (About the mortality rate in Prague), 1873
 Ueber die Verbreitungsweise des Abdominal und Flecktyphus (On the spread of abdominal and spotted typhus), 1880
 Die Neurasthenie und ihre Behandlung (Neurasthenia and its treatment), 1889
 Ueber den Unterricht in der Innern Medizin an der Universität in Prag in der Letzten Hälfte des Jahrhunderts etc., 1899
 Der acute Gelenkrumatismus (Acute rheumatism of the joints), 1899
 Grundzüge der Therapie (Main features of therapy), 1907.

References 

 Alfred Pribram @ the Jewish Encyclopedia
 Pagel: Biographical Dictionary
 Parts of this article are based on a translation of an article from the German Wikipedia.

19th-century Czech physicians
Austrian pathologists
Academic staff of Charles University
Physicians from Prague
1841 births
1912 deaths